Whitireia New Zealand, previously called Whitireia Community Polytechnic and Parumoana Community College (Māori: Te Kura Matatini o Whitireia), is a government-owned and funded tertiary education institute in New Zealand. It was established in 1986 on the shores of Porirua Harbour and today has 7,500 students, with campuses in Auckland, Wellington, Petone and Porirua.

History
Whitireia was founded in 1986 in Porirua and was originally named Parumoana Community College. It was renamed Whitireia Community Polytechnic in 1989 and Whitireia New Zealand in 2010. It then partnered with Wellington Institute of Technology (WelTec), with the two organisations sharing a combined council. After running into financial difficulties, Whitireia was bailed out by the government with a NZ$15 million grant in 2018. Shortly afterwards, the combined board was sacked and replaced with a commissioner.

Whitireia, alongside all other Institutes of Technology and Polytechnics (ITPs) in New Zealand, was subsumed into the New Zealand Institute of Skills & Technology (NZIST) on 1 April 2020.

Management
Dr Tūroa Royal was the foundation principal and CEO of Whitireia Community Polytechnic from 1986 to 1996. He was succeeded by his deputy, Deirdre Dale, from 1996 to 2006. From 2006 to 2015, Don Campbell was CEO. When Chris Gosling, the current CEO, took over from Campbell in 2015, this was a combined role as chief executive for both Whitireia and WelTec.

Mark Oldershaw is due to take over as chief executive from Gosling on 1 April 2020. The date coincides with Whitireia being subsumed into NZIST.

Campuses

Whitireia operates five campuses in the north island.

Campus locations:

 Porirua Campus, Wi Neera Drive, Porirua
 Te Kahui Auaha 65 Dixon Street Te Aro Wellington 
 Hospitality 52 Cuba Street Te Aro Wellington
 Petone (Weltec) 21 Kensington Avenue Petone 
 Auckland Campus, Queen Street, Auckland

Schools 

 School of Creativity and Hospitality 
 School of Business and Information Technology
 School  of Health and Social Services 
 School of Learner Journey 
 School of Te Wānanga Maori
 School of construction and engineering

References

External links
 Whitireia Community Polytechnic website

Te Pūkenga – New Zealand Institute of Skills and Technology
Buildings and structures in Porirua
Education in the Wellington Region
2020 disestablishments in New Zealand
1986 establishments in New Zealand